The Lockport Union-Sun & Journal is a daily newspaper published in Lockport, New York, United States, and covering municipalities in eastern Niagara County. It is owned by Community Newspaper Holdings Inc. It is available online at www.lockportjournal.com.

It is considered a paper of public record by the Niagara County clerk's office.

The paper began publishing in 1821 as the Niagara Democrat and became The Lockport Observatory in 1822 after a move to Lockport.

References

External links
 Union-Sun & Journal Website
 CNHI Website

Daily newspapers published in New York (state)
Niagara County, New York